The 2021–22 UAB Blazers women's basketball team represents the University of Alabama at Birmingham during the 2021–22 NCAA Division I women's basketball season. The team is led by ninth-year head coach Randy Norton, and plays their home games at the Bartow Arena in Birmingham, Alabama as a member of Conference USA.

Schedule and results

|-
!colspan=12 style=|Exhibition

|-
!colspan=12 style=|Non-conference regular season

|-
!colspan=12 style=|CUSA regular season

|-
!colspan=12 style=| CUSA Tournament

See also
 2021–22 UAB Blazers men's basketball team

Notes

References

UAB Blazers women's basketball seasons
UAB
UAB Blazers women's basketball
UAB Blazers women's basketball